William H. "W.H." Mellen (1829 – 1907) was an American politician.

Born in New York, Mellen came to Minnesota in 1866. He served in the Minnesota House of Representatives in 1876 while living in Currie, Minnesota.

Notes

1829 births
1907 deaths
People from New York (state)
People from Murray County, Minnesota
Members of the Minnesota House of Representatives
19th-century American politicians